Norman Leonard Baker (November 18, 1928 – November 22, 2017) was a navigator on Thor Heyerdahl's Ra, Ra II and Tigris reed boat expeditions. He was the co-author (with Barbara Murphy) of Thor Heyerdahl and the Reed Boat Ra, a 1974 children's book on the expeditions. He was a fellow and director of the Explorers Club, and served as an advisor to Fara Heim, an expedition searching for signs of Viking settlements in North America. Capt. Baker died when the Cessna 172 he was piloting crashed in Pittsford, Vermont on November 22, 2017.

See also
 Ra, a 1972 documentary film
 95-foot schooner, the Anne Kristine.

References

1928 births
2017 deaths
American explorers
American sailors
Cornell University alumni
American navigators
Fellows of the Explorers Club